The Mountain West Conference baseball tournament is the conference championship tournament in baseball for the Mountain West Conference. The winner of the tournament receives the conference's automatic bid to the NCAA Division I baseball tournament.

Tournament
The Mountain West Conference Baseball Tournament is a six-team double-elimination tournament held annually at various location in the Mountain West Conference region.  The winner receives an automatic bid to the NCAA Division I baseball tournament.  The other teams have to hope for an at-large bid.

History
The Mountain West Conference Baseball Tournament began in 2000 as a six team double elimination tournament.  It maintained that format through 2005.  In 2006, with the addition of TCU, the tournament expanded to include all seven teams.  However, in 2007 the format returned to a six team bracket, with the seventh place regular season team left out of the field.  In 2012, with only five teams in the league, the tournament consisted of a four team double elimination tournament.  For 2013, with six teams again competing in the conference, the format will return to a six team bracket, with all teams participating.

Champions

By year
The tournament is hosted by the previous year's regular season champion.

By school

Italics indicate that the program is no longer a Mountain West member.

External links
Mountain West Conference official baseball home page

References